The 1967–68 Scottish Division One was won by Celtic by two points over city rivals Rangers. Motherwell and Stirling Albion finished 17th and 18th respectively and were relegated to the 1968-69 Second Division.

Table

Results

See also
1967–68 in Scottish football
Nine in a row

References

1
Scottish Division One seasons
Scot